Peter Bartram (4 May 1961 in Aarhus) is a former Danish general and Danish Chief of Defence.

Bartram was appointed as Danish Chief of Defence on 20 March 2012 after passing tests promoting him from Brigadier general to General. He succeeded Lieutenant General Bjørn Ingemann Bisserup who was acting Chief of Defence after Knud Bartels left the post for Chairman of the NATO Military Committee.

As the Danish Chief of Defence, general Peter Bartram was the military advisor to the Minister of Defence. He was responsible for the organisation, training and operations of the Defence.

On 28 October 2016, Bartram announce he would be leaving the post, to work for a "large Danish company". On 11 January 2017, Bartram left the post as Chief of Defence, and became Vice Chairman at JP/Politikens Hus and Vice Chairman at Jyllands-Postens Fond.

Awards and decorations
General Peter Bartram has been awarded several medals including:

References

External links 
 Danish Ministry of Defense announcing Peter Bartram as Chief of Defense

1961 births
Danish generals
Living people
People from Aarhus
Grand Crosses of the Order of the Dannebrog
20th-century Danish military personnel
21st-century Danish military personnel